Castelleone is a  of the  of Deruta in the Province of Perugia, Umbria, central Italy. It stands at an elevation of 398 metres above sea level. At the time of the Istat census of 2001 it had 91 inhabitants.

References 

Frazioni of the Province of Perugia